Metaxaglaea viatica, the roadside sallow moth, is a moth of the family Noctuidae. It is found in North America, where it has been recorded from Alabama, Arkansas, Florida, Georgia, Illinois, Indiana, Kansas, Kentucky, Maine, Maryland, Massachusetts, Michigan, New Hampshire, New Jersey, North Carolina, Ohio, Oklahoma, South Carolina, Tennessee, Texas, Virginia, West Virginia and Wisconsin.

The wingspan is about 50 mm. The forewings are dull chestnut brown with purplish antemedial and pоstmedial lines. There are large orbicular and reniform spots that are darker than the ground colour and partly outlined with pale yellow. The hindwings are grey. Adults have been recorded on wing from September to March.

The larvae feed on apple, crab apple, mountain ash and cherry.

References

Xyleninae
Moths described in 1874